The 2013 Boels Rental Hills Classic is the 10th running of the Holland Hills Classic, a women's cycling event in Limburg the Netherlands.

Results

Source

See also
2013 in women's road cycling

References

External links

Holland Hills Classic
Boels Rental Hills Classic
Boels Rental Hills Classic